Nathan Elliot Holland (born 19 June 1998) is an English professional footballer who plays as a midfielder for EFL League One club Milton Keynes Dons. 

He previously played for Everton and West Ham United, and had two loan spells with Oxford United.

Club career

Everton
Holland joined the academy of Premier League club Everton at the age of nine. He progressed through several age groups and signed his first professional contract in January 2016.

West Ham United
On 22 January 2017, Holland joined West Ham United, signing a three-and-a-half-year deal. He made his first team debut on 19 September 2017 in a 3–0 EFL Cup third round home win over Bolton Wanderers, coming on as a 61st-minute substitute. Holland went on to feature regularly for the club's U23 side in both Premier League 2 and the EFL Trophy, and in May 2019 signed a new three-year contract keeping him at West Ham until 2022. On 4 December 2019, he made his Premier League debut as a 71st-minute substitute in a 2–0 defeat away to Wolverhampton Wanderers.

On 8 January 2020, Holland joined EFL League One club Oxford United on loan for the remainder of the 2019–20 season. He scored his first senior professional goal on 4 February 2020 in a 3–2 FA Cup fourth round defeat at home to Newcastle United. Holland's loan spell was cut short in March 2020 after sustaining a hamstring injury which ruled him out for the remainder of the season. In July 2021, he returned to Oxford United for a second loan spell ahead of the 2021–22 season. Following his return to West Ham at the conclusion of the season, Holland was one of several players released by the club.

Milton Keynes Dons
On 22 June 2022, Holland joined EFL League One club Milton Keynes Dons on a permanent deal following his release from West Ham. He made his debut on 30 July 2022 in a 1–0 defeat away to Cambridge United.

International career
As well as England, Holland is eligible to represent Barbados. He made 26 appearances for England at U16 to U19 level, including 15 appearances and 2 goals for the U17 side.

Career statistics

References

External links

England profile at The Football Association

1998 births
Living people
Association football midfielders
West Ham United F.C. players
Everton F.C. players
England youth international footballers
English footballers
People from Wythenshawe
Footballers from Manchester
Premier League players
Oxford United F.C. players
Milton Keynes Dons F.C. players
English Football League players